Kim Duk-koo (Hangul:김득구; born Lee Deokgu, Hangul: 이덕구; July 29, 1955November 18, 1982) was a South Korean boxer who died after fighting in a world championship boxing match against Ray Mancini. His death sparked reforms aimed at better protecting the health of boxers, including reducing the number of rounds in championship bouts from 15 to 12.

Early life and education
Kim was born in Gangwon Province, South Korea, 100 miles east of Seoul, the youngest of five children. His father died when he was two and his mother married three more times. Kim grew up poor. He worked odd jobs such as a shoe-shining boy and a tour guide before getting into boxing in 1976.

Professional career

After compiling a 29–4 amateur record, he turned professional in 1978.  In February 1982, he won the Orient and Pacific Boxing Federation lightweight title and became the World Boxing Association's number 1 contender.  Kim carried a 17–1–1 professional record into the Mancini fight and had won 8 bouts by KO before flying to Las Vegas as the world's (WBA) number 1 challenger to world lightweight champion Mancini.  However, he had fought outside of South Korea only once before, in the Philippines. It was his first time ever fighting in North America.

Mancini match
Kim was lightly regarded by the U.S. boxing establishment, but not by Ray Mancini, who believed the fight would be a "war".  Kim struggled to lose weight in the days prior to the bout so that he could weigh in under the lightweight's 135-pound limit. Before the fight, Kim was quoted as saying "Either he dies, or I die."  He wrote the message "live or die" on his Las Vegas hotel lampshade only days before the bout (a mistaken translation led to "kill or be killed" being reported in the media).

Mancini and Kim met in an arena outside Caesars Palace on November 13, 1982 (the night after Aaron Pryor defeated Alexis Arguello). They went toe to toe for a good portion of the bout, to the point that Mancini briefly considered quitting. Kim tore open Mancini's left ear and puffed up his left eye, and Mancini's left hand swelled to twice its normal size. After the fight Mancini's left eye would be completely closed.  However, by the latter rounds, Mancini began to dominate, landing many more punches than Kim.  In the 11th he buckled Kim's knees. In the beginning of the 13th round Mancini charged Kim with a flurry of 39 punches but had little effect. Sugar Ray Leonard (working as one of the commentators of the fight) said Kim came right back very strong. Leonard later declared the round to be closely contested. When the fighters came out for the 14th round, Mancini charged forward and hit Kim with a right.  Kim reeled back, Mancini missed with a left, and then Mancini hit Kim with another hard right hand.  Kim went flying into the ropes, his head hitting the canvas.  Kim managed to rise unsteadily to his feet, but referee Richard Green stopped the fight and Mancini was declared the winner by TKO nineteen seconds into the 14th round.  Ralph Wiley of Sports Illustrated, covering the fight, would later recall Kim pulling himself up the ropes as he was dying as "one of the greatest physical feats I had ever witnessed".

Minutes after the fight was over, Kim collapsed into a coma and was removed from the Caesars Palace arena on a stretcher and taken to the Desert Springs Hospital. Emergency brain surgery was performed at the hospital to try to save him, but Kim died five days after the bout, on November 18. The neurosurgeon said it was caused by one punch. The week after, Sports Illustrated published a photo of the fight on its cover, under the heading Tragedy in the Ring. The profile of the incident was heightened by the fight having been televised live by CBS in the United States.

Kim had never fought a 15-round bout before. In contrast, Mancini was much more experienced at the time. He had fought 15-round bouts three times and gone on to round 14 once before. Kim compiled a record of 17 wins with two losses and one draw. Eight of Kim's wins were knockouts.

Aftermath of Kim's death
Mancini went through a period of reflection, as he blamed himself for Kim's death. After friends helped him by telling him that it was just an accident, Mancini went on with his career, though still haunted by Kim's death.  His promoter, Bob Arum, said Mancini "was never the same" after Kim's death.  Two years later, Mancini lost his title to Livingstone Bramble.

Four weeks after the fatal fight, the Mike Weaver vs. Michael Dokes fight at the same Caesars Palace venue ended with a technical knockout declared 63 seconds into the fight.  Referee Joey Curtis admitted to stopping the fight early under orders of the Nevada State Athletic Commission, which required referees to be aware of a fighter's health, in light of the ManciniKim fight, and a rematch was ordered.

Kim's mother flew from South Korea to Las Vegas to be with her son before the life support equipment was turned off. Three months later, she committed suicide by drinking a bottle of pesticide. The bout's referee, Richard Green, committed suicide via self-inflicted gunshot wound on July 1, 1983.

Kim left behind a fiancée, Lee Young-Mee, despite rules against South Korean boxers having girlfriends.  At the time of Kim's death, Lee was pregnant with their son, Kim Chi-Wan, who was born in July 1983. Kim Chi-Wan became a dentist.  In 2011, Kim Chi-Wan and his mother had a meeting with Ray Mancini as part of a documentary on the life of Mancini called The Good Son.

In popular culture, the San Francisco-based band Sun Kil Moon’s first album, Ghosts of the Great Highway, has three tracks named after boxers, including a song about Duk-koo Kim which references the Mancini fight; Sports Illustrated included the song on its list of greatest songs about sports.

Boxing rule changes
The Nevada State Athletic Commission proposed a series of rule changes as a result, announcing it before a December 10 match between Michael Dokes and Mike Weaver that would in itself be disputed because of what officials were informed before the fight.  The break between rounds was initially proposed to go from 60 to 90 seconds (but it was later rescinded).  The standing eight count (which allows a knockdown to be called even if the boxer is not down, but on the verge of being knocked down) was imposed, and new rules regarding suspension of licence were imposed (45 days after a knockout loss).

The World Boxing Council (WBC), whose regional championship Kim held prior to relinquishing it for a WBA championship opportunity, announced during its annual convention of 1982 that many rules concerning fighters' medical care before fights needed to be changed. One of the most significant was the WBC's reduction of title fights from 15 rounds to 12. The World Boxing Association (WBA), which sanctioned the fatal match, and the International Boxing Federation (IBF) followed the WBC in 1987. When the World Boxing Organization (WBO) was formed in 1988, it immediately began operating with 12-round world championship bouts.

In the years after Kim's death, new medical procedures were introduced to fighters' pre-fight checkups, such as  electrocardiograms, brain tests, and lung tests. As one boxing leader put it, "A fighter's check-ups before fights used to consist of blood pressure and heartbeat checks before 1982. Not anymore."

Professional boxing record

|-
| colspan=8|
|-
| style="border-style: none none solid solid; background: #e3e3e3"|Res.
| style="border-style: none none solid solid; background: #e3e3e3"|Record
| style="border-style: none none solid solid; background: #e3e3e3"|Opponent
| style="border-style: none none solid solid; background: #e3e3e3"|Type
| style="border-style: none none solid solid; background: #e3e3e3"|Rd., Time
| style="border-style: none none solid solid; background: #e3e3e3"|Date
| style="border-style: none none solid solid; background: #e3e3e3"|Location
| style="border-style: none none solid solid; background: #e3e3e3"|Notes
|-
|Loss
|17–2–1
| Ray Mancini
|KO
|14 
|November 13, 1982
|Caesars Palace, Nevada, U.S.
|For WBA Lightweight title; Kim died 5 days later.  Kim's WBC OPBF title vacated. 
|-
|Win
|17–1–1
| Tadao Ishido
|TKO
|4 
|July 18, 1982
|Seoul, South Korea
|For Kim's WBC OPBF lightweight title
|-
|Win
|16–1–1
| Nick Caputol
|UD
|10 
|June 21, 1982
|Seoul, South Korea
|Non-Championship bout
|-
|Win
|15–1–1
| Flash Villamer
|UD
|12 
|May 30, 1982
|Seoul, South Korea
|For Kim's WBC OPBF lightweight title
|-
|Win
|14–1–1
| Suradej Kiongphajorn
|KO
|1 
|April 4, 1982
|Seoul, South Korea
|For Kim's WBC OPBF lightweight title
|-
|Win
|13–1–1
| Kwang-Min Kim
|UD
|12 
|February 28, 1982
|Seoul, South Korea
|For WBC OPBF lightweight title
|-
|Win
|12–1–1
| Katsuhiro Okubo
|TKO
|3 
|December 12, 1981
|Seoul, South Korea
|
|-
|Win
|11–1–1
| Flash Romeo
|KO
|4 
|September 9, 1981
|Seoul, South Korea
|
|-
|Win
|10–1–1
| Jun Escalera
|PTS
|10 
|August 16, 1981
|Seoul, South Korea
|
|-
|Win
|9–1–1
| Hong-Kyu Lim
|TKO
|4 
|April 22, 1981
|Seoul, South Korea
|
|-
|Win
|8–1–1
| Pil-Gu Lee
|PTS
|10 
|December 6, 1980
|Seoul, South Korea
|Lightweight title
|-
|Win
|7–1–1
| Tony Flores
|TKO
|8 
|July 16, 1980
|Metro Manila, Philippines
|
|-
|Win
|6–1–1
| Han-Ki Choi
|KO
|8 
|June 21, 1980
|Seoul, South Korea
|
|-
|style="background:#dae2f1;"|Draw
|5–1–1
| Chang-Pyo Kim
|PTS
|8 
|February 26, 1980
|Pusan, South Korea
|
|-
|Win
|5–1
| Young-Dae Kim
|PTS
|4 
|October 6, 1979
|Seoul, South Korea
|
|-
|Win
|4–1
| Suk-Soo Chang
|PTS
|4 
|September 1, 1979
|Seoul, South Korea
|
|-
|Win
|3–1
| Myung-Soo Park
|KO
|1 
|March 25, 1979
|Ulsan, South Korea
|
|-
|Loss
|2–1
| Jong-Sil Lee
|PTS
|4 
|December 9, 1978
|Seoul, South Korea
|
|-
|Win
|2–0
| Young-Wung Sung
|PTS
|4 
|December 8, 1978
|Seoul, South Korea
|
|-
|Win
|1–0
| Myung-Soo Park
|PTS
|4 
|December 7, 1978
|Seoul, South Korea
|Professional debut

Media 
Champion is a 2002 South Korean film about the life and career of Kim Duk-koo, played by Yu Oh-seong.

The Good Son is a book and later 2012 movie about the life of Ray Mancini, that features the reunion of Kim's fiancée and son with Mancini.

The Warren Zevon song "Boom Boom Mancini" references the fatal fight with Kim.

The band Sun Kil Moon has a song referring to the fatality called Duk Koo Kim.

See also 

Tan Teng Kee (died 1935), reported as one of the early boxing fatalities outside of Singapore
Benny Paret (1937–1962), Cuban boxer who died after a match against Emile Griffith  
Davey Moore (1933–1963), another boxer who famously died from an injury sustained in the ring
Choi Yo-sam (1972–2008), former world champion who died after winning his final fight
Johnny Owen (1956–1980), Welsh boxer never regained consciousness after being knocked out in the twelfth round of a WBC World Bantamweight title fight against Lupe Pintor
List of deaths due to injuries sustained in boxing

References

External links

1959 births
1982 deaths
Deaths due to injuries sustained in boxing
Filmed deaths in sports
Sports deaths in Nevada
South Korean male boxers
Lightweight boxers
Sportspeople from Gangwon Province, South Korea